KVVS (105.5 FM) is a simulcast radio station in Rosamond, California owned by iHeartMedia, Inc.. The station carries the Top 40 (CHR) format of KIIS-FM (102.7) from Los Angeles for listeners in northern Los Angeles County and southeastern Kern County, California, collectively known as the Antelope Valley region. Educational Media Foundation-owned KTLW (88.1), which serves the same role as KVVS as an Antelope Valley re-broadcaster of KKLQ-HD2, also transmits from the KVVS transmitter site.

KVVS originates no local programming of its own, and simulcasts KIIS-FM full-time. Outside an automated station identification overlay hourly over its air, there is no other acknowledgement of KVVS itself on KIIS-FM, or on any of its web and social media presences.

History
105.5 FM signed on in 1988 as a Christian talk station known as KAVC. The format lasted until 1998, when its format and intellectual property shifted to 1340 AM in Mojave after 105.5 was purchased by Clear Channel Communications. The station became KOSS with a new adult contemporary format as 105.5 The Oasis, which leaned towards hot AC in the intervening years. 

In December 2007, the station's air staff was dismissed. The KIIS simulcast in the Antelope Valley originated in the early 2000s on 97.7 FM, also in Mohave and then called KVVS-FM, and was shifted to the higher-power signal of 105.5 at that time, with the call letters soon following over. Several other call letter changes among Clear Channel's Antelope Valley cluster of stations also occurred at the same time.

External links
KIIS-FM official website

VVS
Contemporary hit radio stations in the United States
Radio stations established in 1998
IHeartMedia radio stations